Mike Cross (born October 25, 1946 in Maryville, Tennessee) is an American singer-songwriter and musician. His music blends rock, country, pop and folk.  Signed to prominent label Sugar Hill (notable for releases by Doc Watson, Jerry Douglas, Sam Bush, Dolly Parton and numerous others), Cross enjoys a strong fan following at live performances across the nation.  Best known for his humorous songs such as "The Scotsman," his catalog features a wide variety of musical genres and moods.

Discography

References

External links
Official Website
Blade Agency Website
Bio at Sugar Hill Records

1946 births
Living people
People from Maryville, Tennessee
American male singer-songwriters
Singer-songwriters from Tennessee
Guitarists from Tennessee
20th-century American guitarists
American male guitarists
20th-century American male musicians